The Mohammed VI Tower (Arabic: برج محمد السادس)  is a tower in the city of Salé, bordering Rabat, capital of Morocco. It will be the second tallest tower in Africa, it is a project by the Moroccan businessman Othman Benjelloun led by the company O'Tower.

History 
It is a project launched by billionaire Othman Benjelloun, chief executive officer of BMCE.

In 2013, the BMCE group signed an agreement with the Anfa urbanization and developement agency (AUDA) to construct the tower in the new Anfa business district.

In 2014, Benjelloun presented the model of the BMCE tower:“A tower that I wanted represented by a rocket. This rocket will carry thousands of executive members and employees of the BMCE group to space. This Rocket will be ready for take-off from a Launch Pad, also represented in this project."Its objective was to build a rocket-shaped tower in Casablanca that will house the new headquarters of the banking group. Othman Benjelloun claims that the rocket shape would be inspired from his experience in the United States: “This particular shape is inspired by my visit to the NASA space agency, at Cape Canaveral in Florida in the USA, where I was invited to participate in a spaceflight simulation, in 1969, in company of the astronaut Pete Conrad, prior to the launch of the actual flight of Apollo 12 to the moon in November of the same year."Originally planned for Casablanca Finance City, the bank's first headquarters was initially slated to be 135 meters high and completed in 2016. Though Othman Benjelloun will then decide to take the project to 190 meters high. The project began on 9 March 2016, when King Mohammed VI laid the first stone of the new skyscraper, at a cost of 357 million euros.

In March 2016, the tower was added 10 additional floors and was announced to be built in the city of Salé. It will no longer house the bank's headquarters but will become a mix of components for hotel use, officers, residential and retail.

Construction is being carried out by the Moroccan company TGCC, a national leading in public works and buildings and the China Railway Construction Corporation (CRCCI). Via its subsidiary SIXCO and Belgian group BESIX, which built the Burj Khalifa in Dubai, plays an important role.

The architects of the tower are Spanish architect Rafael de la Hoz and Moroccan architect Hakim Benjelloun.

Started in July 2017, its completion is announced for 2023. It will measure 250 meters and will be the second tallest tower in Africa. It is designed to be visible from a distance of 50 kilometers all around. It's budget is 3.5 billion MAD. With 55 floors, it will include a luxury hotel, offices, high-end apartments and an observatory located at the top of the tower. The south facade of the tower houses photovoltaic panels.

See also
List of tallest buildings in Morocco
 List of tallest buildings in Africa
List of tallest buildings in the world
List of future tallest buildings
List of tallest buildings
Hassan II Mosque

References

Buildings and structures in Salé
Skyscrapers in Morocco